Blue raspberry is a manufactured flavoring and food coloring for candy, snack foods, syrups, and soft drinks. The flavor and color do not derive from any species of raspberry. According to Jerry Bowman, executive director of the Flavor & Extract Manufacturers Association of the United States as of 2016, the flavor profile of raspberry was developed using "mostly esters of the banana, cherry, and pineapple variety." Sugar is commonly used to create taste appeal for the blue raspberry flavoring.

Food products labeled as blue raspberry flavor are commonly dyed with a bright blue synthetic food coloring, such as brilliant blue FCF (also called Blue #1) having European food coloring number E133. The blue color was used to differentiate raspberry-flavored foods from cherry-, watermelon-, and strawberry-flavored foods, each of which is red.

Blue raspberry flavor and color were first used in the United States in 1958 to add interest to snow cones. Regulatory agencies, such as the US Food and Drug Administration, provide guidelines on artificial flavors and colors for manufacturers out of concern for consumer safety, and have approved the use of blue raspberry as a safe ingredient since 1969.

References

External links 
 

Food additives
Flavors
Raspberry